Harlingen High School South, abbreviated as HHSS, is public high school located in Harlingen, Texas (USA). It is part of the Harlingen Consolidated Independent School District. It is one of five public high schools in Harlingen. Harlingen High School was the sole high school until 1993 when the Alamo Ninth Grade Academy officially changed to a high school. It opened under the leadership of Principal Guadalupe Nava, who would remain in that role until retiring in 2010, and graduated its first class in 1994, with more than 350 seniors.

In 2015, the school was rated "Improvement Required" by the Texas Education Agency.

In 2021, the Hawk football team defeated the Harlingen High School cardinals, for the first time in 14 years, since 2007. The Hawks, under head coach Israel Gonzalez, went undefeated 10-0 in district 32-6A to claim district championship.

Athletics
South is known for its successful baseball and volleyball program. The Harlingen South Hawks compete in the following sports:

Baseball
Basketball
Cross Country
Football
Golf
Soccer
Softball
Swimming and Diving
Tennis
Track and Field
Volleyball

In 2007 South High School's baseball team competed in the 5A State baseball championship.

In 2021, head coach Israel Gonzalez led the Hawk football team to the district championship in an undefeated season.

Traditions

Homecoming
Homecoming week is full of tradition at HHSS. The week is designated spirit week with each day allowing the students to dress in a certain fashion not normally acceptable by rule (e.i. Western day, Orange out day, etc.). On the Thursday night prior to the game on Friday, the Student Council holds an annual homecoming parade and bonfire. The event starts with a parade down Dixieland Road featuring floats which representatives from participating clubs ride on. The parade is followed by a special homecoming pep rally. The night concludes with the traditional Burning of the "S" by the Harlingen South FFA. A large steel "S" is wrapped in cloth set up in a field near the school and set on fire. The Burning of the "S" closely resembles the Burning of the "H" homecoming tradition at cross town rival Harlingen High School. Harlingen South broke off from Harlingen High in 1993. The Homecoming Dance, sponsored by the Student Council is held on the Saturday night following the Friday game.

See also
 Harlingen High School

References

External links
 

Educational institutions established in 1993
Buildings and structures in Harlingen, Texas
Harlingen Consolidated Independent School District high schools
1993 establishments in Texas